Harry 'Jacko' Jackson (1918 – 1984) was a footballer who played as a centre forward or inside forward in the Football League for Manchester City, Preston North End, Blackburn Rovers and Chester. He also appeared for a variety of clubs as a 'guest' player during the war including Accrington Stanley, Tottenham Hotspur and Watford whilst being stationed around London and the South Coast serving in the Royal Navy.

In the 1948–49 season he scored 4 goals in 4 appearances for Mossley.

After his time with Chester he played for Hyde United, Ashton United, Nelson and Clitheroe.

References

1918 births
1984 deaths
Footballers from Blackburn
Association football forwards
English footballers
Darwen F.C. players
Burnley F.C. players
Manchester City F.C. players
Preston North End F.C. players
Blackburn Rovers F.C. players
Chester City F.C. players
Hyde United F.C. players
English Football League players
Mossley A.F.C. players
Ashton United F.C. players
Nelson F.C. players
Clitheroe F.C. players